Victory 2006 was a joint Get out the vote (GOTV) project between the California Republican Party and Californians for Schwarzenegger, with the intent of re-electing Governor Arnold Schwarzenegger and electing the entire Republican slate of candidates during the California gubernatorial election, 2006.

Background 

The Victory program was the brainchild of President Bush' former advisor, Matthew Dowd, who was looking to assemble the largest GOTV effort ever attempted in a single state.  The final product consisted of over 70,000 volunteers & 48 VoIP phone centers placed in targeted locations throughout California.

Each of the 48 offices was given names of potential supporters that needed to be contacted.  These names were determined by party registration, any by microtargeting potential non-partisan supporters.

Budget 

Approximately $20 – 25 million was spent on the Victory 06 program.  This amount was spent on budgeting & supplies for 48 offices, VoIP technology & microtargeted data.

"For $20 million, which is what the Team Arnold-led Victory ‘06 program is costing. What that not so small fortune has bought is a state-of-the-art computerized telecommunications system, highly sophisticated “data mining” to enable “micro targeting” of potential supporters, and a cadre of some 75 staffers working for the Republican Victory ‘06 and Schwarzenegger campaign operations. Beginning last spring, working outward through concentric circles of core Republican activists and Schwarzenegger admirers to entirely new people, this group set about the task of recruiting 90,000 volunteers to work, at various stages of the campaign up through election day get out the vote operations, a universe of some 1.5 million voters." 
Bill Bradley - New West Notes, October 10, 2006

Technology 

Each office consisted of a T1 line, as well as 40 VoIP phone lines.  The VoIP technology allowed Victory 06 to accurately track the amount of phone calls made from each location with real time statistics.

The offices also consisted of call sheets that were used by volunteers.  Each sheet had information that would be filled out by the volunteer & scanned back into the Victory 06 system, which would then be updated in real-time.

Volunteer Activities 

The main focus of each Victory office was to have all 40 phone lines filled with volunteers making phone calls & reaching out to potential voters.  Each of the 48 offices had varying levels of success with volunteer recruitment.  Governor Schwarzenegger's soaring poll numbers led to a decrease in the urgency to volunteer.

Critiques 

The Victory '06 program has come under fire after Election Day, as Conservative Republicans were displeased by the fact that only one other Republican besides Schwarzenegger was elected.  Steve Poizner was easily elected to the position of Insurance Commissioner.

Victory offices 

A list of all of the Victory offices with their accompanying field director.

External links
 California Republican Party
 CA Secretary of State - 2006 Election Results
 Mrs. Bush's Remarks at California Victory 2006 Rally

2006 establishments in California
Arnold Schwarzenegger
2006 California elections

Organizations based in California
Organizations established in 2006
Political campaigns
Voter turnout organizations